The Battle of Camalig in Albay province, Philippines, was fought on April 2, 1898 between the forces of colonial Spanish government in Bicol Region and Bicolanos under Bicolano revolutionaries General Vito Belarmino (the Zone Commander of Katipunero Forces in the Bicol Region), Simeón Ola, and Glicerio Delgado during the Philippine Revolutionary War. The latter were victorious in this battle, and General Vito Belarmino, in gratitude to his leadership, promoted Ola to the rank of Captain.

See also
Siege of Masbate

Battles of the Philippine Revolution
History of Albay